Computational methods use different properties of protein sequences and structures to find, characterize and annotate protein tandem repeats.

Sequence-based annotation methods

Structure-based annotation methods

References